Oracle BPEL Process Manager is a BPEL engine that is a member of the Oracle Fusion Middleware family of products.  It enables enterprises to orchestrate disparate applications and Web services into business processes. The ability to quickly build and deploy these processes in a standards-based manner delivers critical functionality for developing a Service-Oriented Architecture (SOA).

Oracle BPEL engine was acquired from Collaxa, formally called Collaxa BPEL Server, in April 2004. Now it is a part of the Oracle SOA Suite.

See also
 Comparison of business integration software

References

External links
 

BPEL Process Manager